Komarov (from комар meaning mosquito) is a Russian masculine surname, its feminine counterpart is Komarova. It may refer to:

 Aleksey Komarov (1921–2013), Russian Olympic rower
 Alexey Komarov (1879-1977), Russian wildlife artist
 Dimitri Komarov (born 1968), Ukrainian chess grandmaster
 Igor Komarov (born 1964), director of Roscosmos since 2015
 Leo Komarov (born 1987), Finnish ice hockey player
 Mikhail Yuryevich Komarov (b. 1984), Russian footballer
 Mykola Komarov (born 1961), Soviet rower
 Natalia Komarova (b. 1971), Russian-American mathematician
 Natalya Komarova (born 1955), Russian politician
 Nikolay Komarov (politician) (1886–1937), Russian revolutionary and a Soviet politician in 10th Orgburo of the Russian Communist Party (Bolsheviks)
 Nikolay Vasilyevich Komarov (1831-?), Russian non-commissioned officer and founder of Vladivostok

 Stanislava Komarova (born 1986), Russian swimmer
 Vissarion Komarov (1832–1908), Russian journalist and editor; Serbian Army general 
 Vladimir Komarov (1927–1967), Soviet cosmonaut, killed on landing of the Soyuz 1 mission.
 Kosmonaut Vladimir Komarov, satellite tracking ship, named after him
 Vladimir Komarov (footballer) (born 1980), Russian association football player
 Vladimir Komarov (speed skater) (1949-2018), Olympic speed skater
 Vladimir Andreyevich Komarov (born 1976), Russian musician
 Vladimir Leontyevich Komarov (1869–1945), Russian botanist
 Vyacheslav Komarov (born 1950), Russian football coach and player
 Yelena Komarova (born 1985), Azerbaijani wrestler
 Yury Komarov (businessman) (born 1945), Russian businessman
 Yury Komarov (footballer) (born 1954), Russian footballer

Russian-language surnames